Magdalena Maleeva was the defending champion but lost in the first round to Kimberly Po.

Martina Hingis won in the final 6–2, 6–0 against Monica Seles.

Seeds
A champion seed is indicated in bold text while text in italics indicates the round in which that seed was eliminated. The top four seeds received a bye to the second round.

  Monica Seles (final)
  Lindsay Davenport (quarterfinals)
  Martina Hingis (champion)
  Mary Joe Fernández (second round)
  Brenda Schultz-McCarthy (semifinals)
  Magdalena Maleeva (first round)
  Chanda Rubin (first round)
  Karina Habšudová (first round)

Draw

Final

Section 1

Section 2

External links
 1996 Bank of the West Classic Draw

Silicon Valley Classic
1996 WTA Tour